Windows-1255 is a code page used under Microsoft Windows to write Hebrew. It is an almost compatible superset of ISO-8859-8 most of the symbols are in the same positions (except for A4, which is 'sheqel sign' in Windows-1255 but 'generic currency sign' in ISO 8859-8 and except for DF, which is undefined in Windows-1255 but 'double low line' in ISO 8859-8), but Windows-1255 adds vowel-points and other signs in lower positions.

IBM uses code page 1255 (CCSID 1255, euro sign extended CCSID 5351, and the further extended CCSID 9447) for Windows-1255.

Modern applications prefer Unicode to Windows-1255, especially on the Internet; meaning UTF-8, the dominant encoding for web pages (or UTF-16, while not on the Internet for security reasons). Windows-1255 is used by less than 0.1% of websites.

Character set
The following table shows Windows-1255. Each character is shown with its Unicode equivalent.

Usage
Windows-1255 Hebrew is always in logical order (as opposed to visual). Microsoft Hebrew products (Windows, Office and Internet Explorer) brought logically-ordered Hebrew to common use, with the result that Windows-1255 is the Hebrew encoding that can be found most on the Web, having ousted the visually ordered ISO-8859-8, and preferred to the logically ordered ISO-8859-8-I because it provides for vowel-points.

Relation to Unicode
The Unicode Hebrew block (U+0590–U+05FF) follows Windows-1255 by encoding both letters and vowel-points in the same relative positions as Windows-1255. Unicode goes further in encoding cantillation marks in lower positions. Unicode Hebrew is always in logical order.

For modern applications UTF-8 or UTF-16 is a preferred encoding.

See also
 7-bit Hebrew under ISO 646
 Code page 862
 ISO 8859-8
 LMBCS-3

References

External links
IANA Charset Name Registration of windows-1255

Windows code pages